Paul Darboux (May 10, 1919 - 1982) was a Beninese merchant and politician, most active when his country was known as Dahomey.

Early life
Darboux was born to a noble Djougou family on May 10, 1919. He soon became an important merchant, and a power base rapidly grew around him, among the Dendi and Wangara peoples of the north. He had ambitions on the Dahomeyan political scene, and helped finance Hubert Maga's deputy campaigns.

Political career
In the legislative elections of June 17, 1951, when Dahomey was allowed an additional representative in the French National Assembly, Maga ran for that office. As per a May 1951 electoral law, each candidate had to give the name of another who would occupy the second seat in the event that the other party's first candidate came in third or below. Maga decided to run with Darboux, and won the election.

He founded his own political party, the Défense des Intérêts Économiques, in 1956. This would occasionally go under the names of Union des Indépendants du Dahomey or Independents du Nord during his long political career. In the 1957 territorial assembly elections, he narrowly won the district of Djougou and gained himself a seat. Darboux allied with Sourou-Migan Apithy, and was rewarded with the post of Minister of Labor and Social Affairs in Apithy's government of 1958. The new minister owned the trade union Syndicat des Commerçants Africains du Dahomomey, which he used to advance his political aspirations.

President Hubert Maga retained Darboux in his administration from 1960 to 1963 as Minister of Economics and Commerce. He gained power in the Atakora region and hatred in Djougou. On October 28, 1963, Chief of Staff of the 800-man Dahomeyan Army Christophe Soglo overthrew Maga and established his own regime. In its wake, Darboux was imprisoned for mishandling fiscal resources. His whereabouts were unknown until 1970, when he campaigned for Maga in the upcoming election. When a Presidential Council form of government was established that year, Darboux was voted president of the Assemblée Consultative Nationale, a consultative assembly. After the October 1972 coup, the Assemblée was dismissed.

References

Bibliography

 .
 .
 .

1919 births
1982 deaths
People from Djougou
People of French West Africa
Government ministers of Benin
Members of the National Assembly of the French Fourth Republic
Beninese merchants